Michael L. Hogan (born November 1, 1954) is a former American football running back in the National Football League (NFL) for the Philadelphia Eagles, the San Francisco 49ers, and the New York Giants.  He played college football at the University of Tennessee at Chattanooga.

1954 births
Living people
Sportspeople from Rome, Georgia
American football running backs
Chattanooga Mocs football players
Philadelphia Eagles players
San Francisco 49ers players
New York Giants players